is a Japanese boxer. He competed in the men's light middleweight event at the 1984 Summer Olympics.

References

1957 births
Living people
Japanese male boxers
Olympic boxers of Japan
Boxers at the 1984 Summer Olympics
Place of birth missing (living people)
Asian Games medalists in boxing
Boxers at the 1986 Asian Games
Asian Games silver medalists for Japan
Medalists at the 1986 Asian Games
Light-middleweight boxers